The first annual Altazor Awards 2000 took place on March 30, 2000, at the Teatro Municipal de Santiago. The nominees were announced on March 20.

Nominations
Winners are in bold text.

Literary Arts

Narrative
 Poli Délano  – La Cola
 Rafael Gumucio  – Memorias Prematuras
 Hernán Rivera Letelier  – Donde mueren los valientes
 Antonio Skármeta  – La Boda del Poeta

Poetry
 Efraín Barquero  – Antología
 Claudio Bertoni  – Una Carta
 José María Memet  – Amanecer sin dioses
 Armando Uribe  – Imágenes quebradas

Visual Arts

Painting
 Gracia Barrios  – Escenas de pintura local
 Sammy Benmayor  – Estudios Antropológicos
 Roser Bru  – Homenaje a Goya
 Bruna Truffa and Rodrigo Cabezas  – Si vas para Chile

Sculpture
 Federico Assler  – Flora y Ferrum
 Francisco Gacitua  – Cordillera de los Andes
 Osvaldo Peña  – El Puente
 Norma Ramírez  – Cuerpo

Engraving and Drawing
 Francisco Copello  – Retrospectiva de Francisco Copello
 Santos Chávez  – Grabados
 Teresa Gazitúa  – Sus palmas están a la vista
 Natasha Pons  – Blanco y Negro

Installation art and Video art
 Rodrigo Cabezas and Bruna Truffa  – Si vas para Chile
 Gonzalo Díaz  – Unidos en la gloria y en la muerte
 Ismael Frigerio  – Anatomía Monumental

Photography
 Enrique Cerda  – Instantáneas
 Alvaro Larco  – De la cordillera al mar
 Mariana Mathews  – Adoremos
 Rodrigo and Diego Opazo  – Photokontexto

Performing Arts Theatre

Dramaturgy
 Jorge Díaz  – Nadie es profeta en su espejo and El velero en la botella
 Marco Antonio de la Parra  – Madrid Sarajevo and La puta madre
 Juan Radrigán Rojas  – Hechos consumados
 La Troppa  – Gemelos

Director
 Ricardo Balic  – Las copas de la ira
 Alfredo Castro  – Hechos Consumados
 Ramón Griffero  – Brunch
 La Troppa  – Gemelos

Actor
 Carlos Concha  – Las Copas de la Ira
 Jaime Lorca  – Gemelos
 José Soza  – Hechos Consumados
 Alberto Vega  – Art

Actress
 Amparo Noguera  – Hechos Consumados
 Elsa Pobrete  – La viuda de Apablaza
 Laura Pizarro  – Gemelos
 Tichy Lobos  – Quien con niños se acuesta amanece mojado

Performing Arts Dance

Choreography
 Luis Eduardo Araneda  – Terenae
 Nelson Avilés  – Hombres en círculo durante el Hechizo del tiempo
 Vicky Larraín  – El cuerpo en el barro
 Francisca Sazié  – Zero

Male Dancer
 Mauricio Barahona
 Alfredo Bravo
 Luis Ortigoza
 José Luis Vidal

Female Dancer
 Carola Alvear
 Magdalena Bahamondes
 Viviana Romo
 Rayén Soto

Musical Arts

Classical music
 Ensemble Bartok  – América en vanguardia
 Alejandro Guarello  – Alejandro Guarello
 Carmen Luisa Letelier  – CD Recording of Federico Heinlein and Homage to Domingo Santa Cruz
 Miguel Villafruela  – Promotion and dissemination of Chilean music

Traditional music
 Banda Bordemar  – Bordemar al abordaje
 Víctor Hugo Campusano  – Altamar y La Cueca Pulenta
 Quelentaro  – El Poder de Quelentaro
 Pedro Yáñez Contribution to the creation and dissemination trova Ridge

Ballad
 Pablo Herrera  – Yo voy contigo
 Luis Jara  – Lo Nuestro...Ayer y Hoy
 Alberto Plaza  – Polvo de Estrellas
 La Sociedad  – Corazón Latino

Pop/Rock
 Dracma  – Dracma
 La Pozze Latina  – Desde el mundo de los espejos
 Makiza  – Aerolíneas
 Joe Vasconcellos  – Vivo

Alternative/Jazz
 Francesca Ancarola  – Que el Canto tiene Sentido
 Alberto Cumplido  – Atermporal
 La Chimuchina  – Sonchapu
 Antonio Restucci  – Vetas

Playing
 René Arangua (piano and keyboards)
 Cristián Gálvez (bass)
 Patricio Pailamilla (trumpet)

Media Arts Film

Director
 Juan Vicente Araya  – No tan lejos de Andrómeda
 Cristián Galaz  – El Chacotero Sentimental: La película
 Gonzalo Justiniano  – Tuve un sueño contigo
 Andrés Wood  – El Desquite

Screenplay
 Juan Vicente Araya  – No tan lejos de Andrómeda
 Mateo Iribarren  – El Chacotero Sentimental: La película
 Boris Quercia and Andrés Wood  – El Desquite
 Gonzalo Justiniano  – Tuve un sueño contigo

Actor
 Pablo Macaya  – El Chacotero Sentimental: La película
 Daniel Muñoz  – El Desquite and El Chacotero Sentimental: La película
 Álvaro Rudolphy  – El Entusiasmo
 Nelson Villagra  – Telefilms TVN

Actress
 Tamara Acosta  – El Desquite and El Chacotero Sentimental: La película
 Claudia Celedón  – El Chacotero Sentimental: La película
 Patricia López  – El Desquite
 Lorene Prieto  – El Chacotero Sentimental: La película

Creative Contribution
 Juan Vicente Araya (Original Idea)
 Rumpy and Cristián Galaz (Original Idea and new form of filmmaking)
 Miguel Joannis Littin (Cinematography of El Desquite)

Media Arts TV

Director
 Christián Leighton  – Los Patiperros
 Rodrigo Moreno  – Ovni
 Vicente Sabatini  – La Fiera
 Alvaro Díaz and Pedro Peirano  – Factor Humano

Screenplay
 Fernando Aragón, Hugo Morales, Arnaldo Madrid and Nona Fernández  – Aquelarre
 Sebastián Arrau and Coca Gómez  – Cerro Alegre
 Pablo Illanes  – Fuera de Control
 Víctor Carrasco, René Arcos, Alejandro Cabrera and Larisa Contreras  – La Fiera

Actor
 Luis Alarcón  – La Fiera
 Alfredo Castro  – La Fiera
 Francisco Melo  – La Fiera
 Mauricio Pesutic  – Aquelarre
 José Soza  – La Fiera

Actress
 Maricarmen Arrigorriaga  – Aquelarre
 Roxana Campos  – La Fiera
 María Izquierdo  - Cerro Alegre
 Aline Kuppenheim  – La Fiera
 Paulina Urrutia  – Fuera de Control

Creative Contribution
 Sergio Bravo, Luis Ponce, Gilberto Villarroel and Roberto Brodsky (Screenplay of Nuestro Siglo)
 Carlos Leppe (Creative and Art Director of TVN)
 Cristián Warkner and Gerardo Cáceres (Original Idea and Screenplay of Caja Negra)
 Antonio Skármeta (Original Idea and Screenplay of El Show de los Libros)

References

Chilean awards